The Murder of Nicole Brown Simpson is a 2019 American crime horror film directed by Daniel Farrands. The film is loosely based on the murder of Nicole Brown Simpson, presenting a version of events in which Brown Simpson is murdered by serial killer Glen Edward Rogers,  and not by O. J. Simpson, her ex-husband and the primary suspect in the case. Though Mena Suvari's performance as Nicole Brown was praised, the film was panned by critics.

Cast
Mena Suvari as Nicole Brown Simpson
Nick Stahl as Glen Edward Rogers
Taryn Manning as Faye Resnick
Drew Roy as Ron Goldman
Agnes Bruckner as Kris Kardashian
Gene Freeman as O. J. Simpson

Reception
Frank Scheck of The Hollywood Reporter gave the film a negative review, stating that it (along with several of the director's other films) was the equivalent of "cinematic graverobbing" and that one of the film's only fans will likely be O. J. Simpson. Guy Lodge of Variety also gave it a negative review, calling it an "unabashedly tacky true-crime thriller" and writing that "it's a cheap, unloving death march of a movie", though Lodge offered some praise to Mena Suvari in the title role.

See also
 The Haunting of Sharon Tate
 O.J.: Made in America
 The People v. O. J. Simpson: American Crime Story

References

External links

Trailer

2019 films
2019 crime films
2010s English-language films
American films based on actual events
American crime films
Crime films based on actual events
Cultural depictions of O. J. Simpson
Cultural depictions of male serial killers
Films about murder
Films directed by Daniel Farrands
Quiver Distribution films
2010s American films